Coridel Entertainment is a South Korean entertainment company established in 2015 by Tyler Kwon.

History
Coridel Entertainment was founded in 2015 by Tyler Kwon as a subsidiary of the Coridel Group, based in New York City, United States. It merged the same year with a record label called Clear Company, which managed the K-pop girl group Playback and Jeff Bernat's Korean concerts and releases.

On February 28, 2016, Jessica Jung signed with Coridel Entertainment following her split from Girls' Generation in 2014 and departure from her former agency SM Entertainment in 2015. On May 17, 2016, she released her solo debut album under the label titled With Love, J, with the lead single "Fly". On December 10, 2016 she released her second solo album under the label titled Wonderland, with her lead single "Wonderland".
 
In April 2017, Actor Ryu Tae-joon signed with Coridel Entertainment.
 
In September 2018, Singer Kevin Woo signed with Coridel Entertainment.

Artists

Groups
 Playback

Soloists
 Jessica
 Ma Eun-jin
 Jeff Bernat

Actor
 Ryu Tae-joon
 Yun Bok In
 Kim Young Pil
 Lee Kwan Hun 
 Jang Joon Woong
 Cheong Ha Eun
 Lee Hayoung

Former artists

 Kevin Woo

Discography

References

External links
  
  

South Korean companies established in 2015
Companies based in Seoul
Electronic dance music record labels
Film production companies of South Korea
Hip hop record labels
Labels distributed by CJ E&M Music and Live
Labels distributed by Kakao M
Music publishing companies
K-pop record labels
Record labels established in 2015
Contemporary R&B record labels
Synth-pop record labels
South Korean brands
South Korean record labels
Talent agencies of South Korea